Computational Statistics & Data Analysis is a monthly peer-reviewed scientific journal covering research on and applications of computational statistics and data analysis. The journal was established in 1983 and is the official journal of the International Association for Statistical Computing,  a section of the International Statistical Institute.

See also 
List of statistics journals

References

External links 
 

International Statistical Institute
Statistics journals
Publications established in 1983
Monthly journals
English-language journals
Elsevier academic journals